Berry Springs is a locality in the Northern Territory of Australia. The locality is a mostly rural area situated on the Cox Peninsula Road and is sparsely populated. A few businesses and a school are located in the locality.

History
The location is known as Laniyuk by the indigenous Kungarakany people. The name Berry Springs derives from Berry Creek, named by the Surveyor General of South Australia, George Goyder, in 1870, after his chief draftsman, Edwin Berry. Most early development of the area was concentrated around the thriving town of Southport at the confluence of the Blackmore and Darwin Rivers. In 1889, a station named Southport opened on the North Australia Railway, on the road between that town and Berry Springs. The location soon declined in importance however.

During World War II, over 100,000 service personnel were deployed to the Litchfield area. A low weir was built across Berry Creek to provide a swimming pool as part of a rest and recreation camp for troops, and it is still a popular swimming venue.

Economy
A 14ha aquaculture complex, known as ARDA-Tek Barramundi Farm was established in 1998 in the locality. It employs 3 full-time staff. In addition to supplying fish for seafood wholesale, there is a research program aimed at managing disease and creating cheaper, high protein food sources to increase the quality of the fingerlings produced by the farm. The farm offers recreational fishing and tours for visitors, further contributing to tourism and the local economy.

Infrastructure

Education
There is one public primary school located in Berry Springs, Berry Springs Primary School. The school caters to students in Transition to Year 6. A pre-school also operates on the site. There were 217 students enrolled as of August 2010. The current principal is Ms. Leah Crockford.

There are no secondary schools in the suburb, but the Darwin rural area is served by Taminmin College in Humpty Doo for students studying in years 7–12.

Attractions
The Territory Wildlife Park is a zoo located in the locality.

The Berry Springs Nature Park is a public recreation area that includes bushwalking trails, picnic areas and a kiosk where refreshments are available. The park is centred on the springs and catchment which are the source of water for Berry Creek. The clear waters of the pools created by the springs are ideal for observing the aquatic life within, and access is provided for swimming to escape the tropical heat. Information displays are provided detailing the native plants, wildlife and history of the area. The park is open all year round, but during the months of October – April may be closed for swimming depending on local conditions.

References

External links

Suburbs of Darwin, Northern Territory